The 333rd Field Artillery Regiment is a regiment of the Field Artillery Branch of the United States Army.

Part of the regiment's history can be traced to the 333rd Field Artillery Battalion, an African-American racially segregated United States Army unit during World War II. The battalion landed at Normandy in early July 1944 and saw continuous combat as corps artillery throughout the summer. Beginning in October 1944 it was located in Schoenberg, Belgium as part of the U.S. VIII Corps.

The unit was partially overrun by Germans during the onset of the Battle of the Bulge on 17 December 1944. While most of the 333rd FA Battalion withdrew west towards Bastogne, in advance of the German assault, Service and C Batteries remained behind to cover the advance of the 106th Infantry Division. The two batteries suffered heavy casualties, and eleven men were massacred near the Belgian hamlet of Wereth.

Batteries A, E, F, and G, all Target Acquisition sub-units, took part in the 1991 Gulf War respectively with the 1st Cavalry Division; the 210th Field Artillery Brigade; the 3rd Armored Division; and the 24th Infantry Division.

Campaigns
 World War I: Streamer without inscription.
 World War II: Normandy, Northern France, Rhineland, Ardennes-Alsace, Central Europe.
 Southwest Asia: Defense of Saudi Arabia, Liberation and Defense of Kuwait, Cease-Fire.

Lineage of Battery F
Constituted 5 August 1917 in the National Army as Battery F, 333d Field Artillery.

(333d Field Artillery assigned 25 August 1917 to the 86th Infantry Division).

Organized in September 1917 at Camp Grant, Illinois.

Demobilized 23 January 1919 at Camp Grant, Illinois.

Reconstituted 13 September 1929 in the Organized Reserves as Battery F, 333d Field Artillery, an element of the 86th Infantry Division.

(333d Field Artillery relieved 5 October 1929 from assignment to the 86th Infantry Division)

Organized in 1930 at Chicago, Illinois.

Disbanded 22 August 1942 at Chicago, Illinois.

Reconstituted 13 October 1942 in the Regular Army; concurrently, consolidated with Battery F, 333rd Field Artillery (constituted 5 May 1942 in the Regular Army and activated 5 August 1942 at Camp Gruber, Oklahoma), and consolidated unit designated as Battery F, 333d Field Artillery.

Reorganized and redesignated 12 February 1943 as Battery C, 969th Field Artillery Battalion.

Inactivated 15 April 1946 at the New York Port of Embarkation.

Activated 17 June 1946 at Fort Sill, Oklahoma.

Inactivated 15 June 1949 at Fort Sill, Oklahoma.

Activated 18 March 1955 in Korea.

Inactivated 25 June 1958 in Korea.

Redesignated 1 July 1959 as Headquarters and Headquarters Battery, 6th Battalion, 333rd Artillery.

Redesignated 11 November 1966 as Battery F, 333rd Artillery.

Activated 5 March 1967 at Fort Carson, Colorado.

Inactivated 26 May 1967 at Fort Carson, Colorado.

Redesignated 1 September 1971 as Battery F, 333rd Field Artillery.

Assigned 21 September 1978 to the 3rd Armored Division and activated in Germany.

Inactivated 15 November 1991 in Germany and relieved from assignment to the 3rd Armored Division.

Redesignated 1 October 2005 as Battery F, 333rd Field Artillery Regiment.

Activated 30 November 2006 in Korea.

F-TAB "Wolfpack", 333rd FAR, Deactivated 25 November, 2015 in Korea, as a part of HQDA reduction of HQ and separate company sized, brigade level units in the US Army.

Distinctive unit insignia
 Description:
A Gold color metal and enamel device 1 1/8 inches (2.86 cm) in height overall consisting of a shield blazoned: Gules, three pallets Or, each charged with a like number of projectiles, palewise of the first, on a chief of the last, a fleur-de-lis of the first. Attached below and to the sides of the shield is a Gold scroll inscribed “THREE ROUNDS” in Black letters.
 Symbolism:
In the scarlet and gold of the Field Artillery, the functions of the organization are illustrated by the stream of projectiles, and even grouping indicates the ability of the Regiment to perform within narrow limits and that the honors of the Regiment mount with each action. The numerical designation is indicated by the three shells on each of three vertical pales; the service in France in World War I being symbolized by the fleur-de-lis.
 Background:
The distinctive unit insignia was originally approved for the 333d Field Artillery Regiment on 28 November 1942. It was redesignated for the 333d Field Artillery Battalion on 10 November 1943. It was redesignated for the 446th Field Artillery Battalion on 4 March 1947. It was redesignated for the 333d Artillery Regiment on 26 May 1960. Effective 1 September 1971, the insignia was redesignated for the 333d Field Artillery Regiment.

Coat of arms
Blazon
 Shield:
Gules, three pallets Or, each charged with a like number of projectiles, palewise of the first, on a chief of the last, a fleur-de-lis of the first.
 Crest:
On a wreath Or and Gules, a demi-lion rampant Sable armed and langued Azure bearing on the shoulder an escutcheon parti per pale of the second and fourth within a border Argent and grasping a sword-breaker with five barbs Gold.
Motto
THREE ROUNDS.

Symbolism
 Shield:
In the scarlet and gold of the Field Artillery, the functions of the organization are illustrated by the stream of projectiles, and even grouping indicates the ability of the Regiment to perform within narrow limits and that the honors of the Regiment mount with each action. The numerical designation is indicated by the three shells on each of three vertical pales; the service in France in World War I being symbolized by the fleur-de-lis.
 Crest:
The lion, from the arms of Belgium, bearing the red and blue shield from the arms of Bastogne, commemorates the action for which Regiment was awarded the Distinguished Unit Citation embroidered “Bastogne.” The white border around the shield represents the encirclement of that city by the enemy and also refers to the snow-covered terrain of the “Battle of the Bulge.” The “sword-breaker” was a medieval weapon with barbs or teeth which admitted the sword but prevented its withdrawal. It represents the breaking of the military power of the enemy in Europe. The five barbs stand for the unit's participation in five European campaigns in World War II.
 Background:
The coat of arms was originally approved for the 333d Field Artillery Regiment on 28 November 1942. It was redesignated for the 333d Field Artillery Battalion on 9 November 1943. It was redesignated for the 446th Field Artillery Battalion on 13 January 1947. It was redesignated for the 333d Artillery Regiment and amended to delete the Army Reserve crest on 26 May 1960. The insignia was amended to add a crest on 30 March 1966. Effective 1 September 1971, the insignia was redesignated for the 333d Field Artillery Regiment.

Decorations
 Presidential Unit Citation (Army) for: BASTOGNE
 Meritorious Unit Commendation (Army) for: SOUTHWEST ASIA 1990-1991
 Belgian Croix de Guerre 1940 with Palm for: BASTOGNE
 Cited in the "Order of the Day" of the Belgian Army for action at Bastogne.

References

External links

 https://web.archive.org/web/20120805185028/http://www.tioh.hqda.pentagon.mil/Heraldry/ArmyDUISSICOA/ArmyHeraldryUnit.aspx?u=3548

Field artillery regiments of the United States Army
Military units and formations established in 1917
1917 establishments in Illinois